Tipulamima malimba is a moth of the family Sesiidae. It is known from the Republic of the Congo and Gabon.

References

Sesiidae
Fauna of the Republic of the Congo
Fauna of Gabon
Moths of Africa
Moths described in 1899